Banksia conferta, commonly known as the glasshouse banksia, is a species of shrub that is endemic to eastern Australia. It has rough, bark on the trunk, elliptic to egg-shaped leaves arranged in whorls, crowded yellow flowers in a cylindrical spike later forming a relatively large number of follicles.

Description
Banksia conferta is a shrub that typically grows to a height of  but does not form a lignotuber. It has rough, grey, tessellated bark on the trunk and orange, red or brown stems that are hairy at first. The flowers are yellowish green to pinkish brown in the bud stage, turning golden yellow when open. More than 100 follicles often form in each spike, surrounded by the remains of the flowers. The follicles remain until the plant is burned, unlike those of the similar B. integrifolia which also has less crowded flowers.

Taxonomy and naming
Banksia conferta was first collected by Lawrie Johnson from the McPherson Range in Lamington National Park in May 1951, but not formally described until 1981. Alex George named it in the journal Nuytsia from specimens he collected from Mount Tibrogargan in the Glass House Mountains National Park in 1975. The specific epithet (conferta) is a Latin word meaning "crowded". He felt it had evolved from Banksia integrifolia but was distinct enough to warrant species status.

In the same journal, George described variety conferta and var. penicillata, and in 1996 he described subspecies conferta and subsp. penicillata. He described subsp. conferta as being found in southern Queensland on the Lamington Plateau and the Glass House Mountains and subsp. penicillata from Bowral to north of Lithgow in New South Wales.

In 1996, Kevin Thiele and Pauline Ladiges raised subspecies penicillata to species status as B. penicillata in Australian Systematic Botany, based on the differences in habit, bark, leaf shape, indumentum and flower colour, and the fact that the two taxa were so far from each other. According to their morphological cladistic analysis, B. penicillata was sister taxon to B. paludosa. Hence var. conferta and subsp. conferta became synonyms of B. conferta.

Distribution and habitat
This banksia is known from the Lamington Plateau and the Glass House Mountains in southern Queensland where it grows on steep rocky slopes in scrub and open shrubland and in the Coorabakh National Park in New South Wales. Subspecies conferta is restricted to the Coorabakh National Park and is listed as "critically endangered" under the Biodiversity Conservation Act 2016.

References

conferta
Flora of Queensland
Flora of New South Wales
Plants described in 1981